Piyapan Choopetch is a Thai film director and screenwriter. His films include Necromancer and Vow of Death.

Filmography

Director 
 Necromancer (Jom kha mung wej) (2005) 
 Vow of Death (Phii mai jim fun) (2007)
 My Ex (Fan kao) (2009)
 My Ex 2 : Haunted Lover (Fan mai) (2010)

Screenwriter 
 Necromancer (Jom kha mung wej) (2005) (co-written with Kittikorn Liasirikun)

External links

Piyapan Choopetch
Piyapan Choopetch
Living people
Year of birth missing (living people)